Barend Johannes Janse van Rensburg (born 14 January 1997) is a South African professional rugby union player for the  in the Pro14, the  in the Currie Cup and the  in the Rugby Challenge. He is a utility back that can play as a fly-half, centre or fullback.

Rugby career

2014 : Schoolboy rugby

Janse van Rensburg was born in Pretoria and grew up in Thabazimbi.

2015–2016 : Leopards, NWU Pukke and South Africa Under-20

He made twelve starts for the  team in the 2015 Under-19 Provincial Championship, starting five matches at inside centre, five at outside centre and two at fullback.

In March 2016, Janse van Rensburg was included in a South Africa Under-20 training squad, but wasn't initially included in the final South Africa Under-20 squad for the 2016 World Rugby Under 20 Championship tournament to be held in Manchester, England. However, following injuries to S'busiso Nkosi and Embrose Papier during the tournament, he flew out to meet up with the rest of the team. He came on as a replacement in their final match of the tournament, the third-place play-off against Argentina. Argentina beat South Africa for the second time, convincingly winning 49–19 to condemn South Africa to fourth place in the competition.

Shortly before his involvement in the World Rugby Under 20 Championship, he also made his first class debut in South African domestic rugby. He started five more matches in the fly-half position before his short spell with the South Africa Under-20 team, without scoring any points.

2016–2017 : Sharks

Midway through 2016, Janse van Rensburg joined the Durban-based . At the end of October 2016, he was included in the  Super Rugby squad for the 2017 season.

References

South African rugby union players
Living people
1997 births
Rugby union players from Pretoria
Rugby union fly-halves
Rugby union centres
Rugby union fullbacks
Leopards (rugby union) players
South Africa Under-20 international rugby union players
Southern Kings players
Sharks (Currie Cup) players
Sharks (rugby union) players
Free State Cheetahs players
Cheetahs (rugby union) players
Green Rockets Tokatsu players
London Irish players